Casey Nicole Loyd (born February 23, 1989) is an American professional soccer midfielder who most recently played for FC Kansas City of the NWSL in 2013. She had previously played for the Los Angeles Sol, Sky Blue FC and Chicago Red Stars in the WPS and earned one cap with the United States women's national soccer team in 2007. As a member of the United States U-20 women's team, she represented her country at the 2006 FIFA U-20 Women's World Championship and the 2007 Pan American Games.

Early life
Daughter of Victor Nogueira, Casey was born in San Diego, California, while her father played for the San Diego Sockers.  She began playing soccer when she was five.  In 1992, her father moved to the Milwaukee Wave, where he played for 12 seasons. Nogueira grew up in nearby Cedarburg, Wisconsin with her mother.  Her father coached her on local boys' teams until she entered Cedarburg High School at which point, she played for the girls' soccer team.  In 2004, having spent her freshman year in Wisconsin, Nogueira moved to Raleigh, North Carolina with her mother.

In North Carolina, Nogueira attended Broughton High School.  She was the 2005 Gatorade Player of the Year.  She was a 2005 Parade Magazine and NSCAA high school All American and graduated a year early in 2006.  The Capitals won one state championship and finished runner up once during her two years with the team.  2005 state championship MVP.  In addition to her high school team, Nogueira also played for the CASL Spartan Elite, winning the 2005 regional championship and finishing third at the national U-17 championship.

University of North Carolina
In 2006, Nogueira played for the North Carolina Tar Heels women's soccer team.  The Tar Heels won the 2006 National Championship.  While Nogueira had started only one game that season, she started both the semifinal and final games due to team injuries.  Nogueira scored in both games, earning a position on the all tournament team.  She led the team in scoring with 21 goals her junior season, capping the year when she scored both goals as UNC won the 2008 NCAA championships, 2–1 over the University of Notre Dame. As a junior, she won the Honda Sports Award as the nation's top soccer player.

Playing career

Club

Carolina RailHawk Women
In 2008, Nogueira signed with the Carolina RailHawks Women, now known as the Cary Lady Clarets, an expansion W-League team.

Los Angeles Sol
Nogueira was drafted 8th overall to the Los Angeles Sol.

Chicago Red Stars
After the Sol folded, Nogueira was drafted to the Chicago Red Stars. Nogueira made her WPS league debut for the Red Stars as a second-half substitute against Sky Blue FC on April 11, 2010, and scored her first league goal for the club against St. Louis Athletica on April 17, 2010.

Sky Blue FC
After Chicago Red Stars announced it would not be part of the Women's Professional Soccer in 2011, Nogueira signed as a free agent with Sky Blue FC on December 23, 2010. She was named Player of the Week on June 30, 2011.

FC Kansas City
WPS folded in January 2012 and rather than pursue top-flight soccer overseas, Nogueira and moved to Dallas area to be close to her boyfriend and FC Dallas defender Zach Loyd (the two became engaged that February and married in October). After a season with FC Dallas's women's team in the Women's Premier Soccer League, Nogueira –now known as Casey Loyd– was selected during the fourth round (30th overall) of the 2013 NWSL Supplemental Draft by FC Kansas City.

International

Youth teams
Noguiera entered the national team program in 2004, when she was called into the U-16 Women's National Team. She moved up to the U-17 team the next year. In 2006, she was a member of the U.S. U-20 women's national team which took fourth place at the 2006 FIFA U-20 Women's World Championship. In 2007, the U.S. entered its U-20 team in the 2007 Pan American Games even though the other participating nations sent their full national teams. The U.S. won the silver medal, falling to Brazil in the final. Noguiera scored a goal in each of the three group games.

Senior team
She earned  her first cap with the senior team in a 1–1 tie with England on January 28, 2007.  She started, but came off for Lindsay Tarpley at half time. She was called up
to the senior team in May 2009 versus Canada but did not play. In February 2010, she was named to the Algarve Cup roster.

Personal life
She married fellow Tar Heel and FC Dallas defender Zach Loyd on October 13, 2012.  In 2012, the couple began coaching Vickery United, a youth soccer team for children of refugees in the North Dallas neighborhood of Vickery Meadow. They have two sons.

References

External links
 
 US Soccer player profile
 UNC-Chapel Hill player profile
 Chicago Red Stars: Casey Nogueira
 Sky Blue FC: Casey Nogueira
 FC Kansas City player profile

1989 births
Living people
American people of Mozambican descent
American people of Portuguese descent
American women's soccer players
Chicago Red Stars players
NJ/NY Gotham FC players
United States women's international soccer players
North Carolina Tar Heels women's soccer players
Women's Professional Soccer players
Footballers at the 2007 Pan American Games
People from Cedarburg, Wisconsin
Soccer players from Wisconsin
Soccer players from Raleigh, North Carolina
New York Fury players
Needham B. Broughton High School alumni
Women's Premier Soccer League Elite players
FC Kansas City players
Women's association football midfielders
National Women's Soccer League players
Pan American Games silver medalists for the United States
United States women's under-20 international soccer players
Pan American Games medalists in football
Medalists at the 2007 Pan American Games
Soccer players from North Carolina